Šiševo is a village in the municipality of Saraj, North Macedonia.

Demographics
According to the 2021 census, the village had a total of 3,958 inhabitants. Ethnic groups in the village include:

Albanians 3.294
Macedonians 505
Serbs 3
Bosniaks 2
Turks 2 
Romani 87
Vlachs 4
Others 61

Sports
Local football club MFK Treska was taken over by Makedonija Gjorče Petrov's head offise and subsequently changed name into Makedonija Gjorče Petrov 1932 in early 2012.

References

External links

Villages in Saraj Municipality
Albanian communities in North Macedonia